Dejan Milovanović (born 21 January 1984) is a Serbian retired professional footballer.

Personal
He is the son of Đorđe Milovanović, a member of Red Star Belgrade in the late 1970s and early to mid 1980s. Dejan is also the cousin of Serbian international Branislav Ivanović, who plays for WBA.

Club career

Red Star Belgrade
Milovanović was a member of the talented 1984 generation, and was the first to become a first team player from that group. He made his debut for Red Star Belgrade on 17 November 2001 when he was 17. In that match Zvezda won against FK Zemun, the score finishing 2–0. He gathered the attention of the public on his debut, in a derby game against Partizan in which he worked his way past 3 players in fantastic style, scoring a goal that wrapped up the 3–0 victory.

Milovanović has played for the Red Star Belgrade first team since 2001 and he has been the captain of club since 2006. He was also team captain of the Serbian under-21 team who finished second at the 2007 UEFA European Under-21 Championship in the Netherlands. Milovanović played over 200 games for Red Star Belgrade and won three doubles.

Lens
On 4 July 2008, Milovanović officially signed a four-year contract with Lens for an undisclosed fee. Milovanović has been announced as one of the main new signings in the club's effort to return to the top French league. In the summer of 2010, RC Lens allowed Milovanović to return to his former club, Red Star, on a season long loan with an option for a permanent deal.

Voždovac
Milovanović signed with newly promoted Serbian side FK Voždovac in August 2013.

International career
Milovanović was capped twice for Serbia in 2008. With Serbia U21 he played in three UEFA European Under-21 Championships, in 2004, 2006 and 2007. He has won two silver medals in these competitions. He was also part of the Serbia and Montenegro squad at the 2004 Summer Olympics in Athens.

He especially made a good impression in the 2007 UEFA European Under-21 Championship in the Netherlands, carrying the captain's armband, on the way to the finals; in the first match he scored a winning goal against Italy.

Career statistics

Honours
Red Star Belgrade
First League of Serbia and Montenegro: 2003–04, 2005–06
Serbian SuperLiga: 2006–07
Serbia and Montenegro Cup: 2001–02, 2003–04, 2005–06
Serbian Cup: 2006–07
Lens
Ligue 2: 2008–09

References

External links

 
 
 
 

1984 births
Living people
Serbian footballers
Footballers from Belgrade
Association football midfielders
Serbia international footballers
Serbia under-21 international footballers
Serbia and Montenegro under-21 international footballers
Olympic footballers of Serbia and Montenegro
Footballers at the 2004 Summer Olympics
Red Star Belgrade footballers
FK Voždovac players
First League of Serbia and Montenegro players
Serbian SuperLiga players
RC Lens players
Ligue 1 players
Ligue 2 players
Panionios F.C. players
Super League Greece players
Serbian expatriate footballers
Expatriate footballers in France
Expatriate footballers in Greece